Huddersfield Town's 1938–39 campaign was the last full season of football before the start of World War II. Town would finish 19th in Division 1, but they had another brilliant FA Cup run, following from the previous season's runner-up spot, by reaching the semi-finals, before losing to Portsmouth.

Squad at the start of the season

Review
Town continued their downward spiral, which saw Town fighting in a relegation battle for a major part of the season, but luckily most of the season was highlighted by Town's successes in the FA Cup, following their 5th final appearance the previous season. They reached the semi-final against Portsmouth. They lost the match 2–1 at Highbury. This to date, is their last ever FA Cup semi-final appearance. Town's final league placing was 19th just ahead of Chelsea, Birmingham and Leicester City.

Squad at the end of the season

Results

Division One

FA Cup

Appearances and goals

1938–39
English football clubs 1938–39 season